Alina Sorescu (born 14 July 1986 in Bucharest) is a Romanian singer and TV presenter. She is the host of Tonomatul DP2 on TVR2.

Career
Sorescu won first prize at the Children's Music Festival in Bucharest in 1994. She won it again two years later, beating off nationwide competition. She released her debut album in 1997 at the age of 11, Voi fi o stea ("I'll be a star"), with tracks composed by Eugen Mihaescu. In 1999 she toured Europe, performing in concerts in France, Italy, Belgium and the Netherlands, and studied singing with Professor Viorela Filip. She later studied sociology at the University of Bucharest.

Sorescu ventured into a career as a television presenter. She began presenting Ploaia de stele, a music competitive show on TVR 1, which she appeared in along with Cosmin Cernat. She has since presented Vacanță în stil mare, Ora fără catalog, Portativul piticilor, Miss Plaja, and Matinal de vacanță, the latter with co-presenter Leonard Miron. In 2013 she released the single "Numai tu". She now hosts Tonomatul DP2 on TVR2.

Personal life
Sorescu is married to Alexandru Ciuc. The couple have a daughter named Elena.

In 2016 Disney Channel Romania chose the artist to sign the main theme from the series The Lion Guard.

References

External links
Official site 

Romanian television presenters
1986 births
Living people
Musicians from Bucharest
University of Bucharest alumni
21st-century Romanian singers
21st-century Romanian women singers
Romanian women television presenters
Television people from Bucharest